Bench Talkies is a 2015 Indian Tamil language independent anthology film consisting of six short films directed by Karthik Subbaraj, Anil Krishnan, Gopakumar, Charukesh Sekar, Monesh and Rathna Kumar. The film was produced by Subbaraj's newly formed production house Stone Bench Creations and features an ensemble cast including Vijay Sethupathi, Guru Somasundaram, Sananth Reddy and Rishikanth. The film was released on 25 March 2015.

Plot 
Bench Talkies is a collection of six short films directed by six different directors, which will make you travel through different genres, emotions and experiences.

Agavizhi by Gopakumar
Madhu by Rathna Kumar
Nallathor Veenai by Monesh
Neer by Karthik Subbaraj
Puzhu by Charukesh Sekar
The Lost Paradise by Anil Krishnan

Cast

Release 
The anthology film opened to limited screening in Chennai and Coimbatore on 25 March 2015 through Sathyam Cinemas and PVR Cinemas, and was released in Bangalore on 3 April 2015, through PVR Cinemas.

Reception 
Bench Talkies opened to positive reviews from the critics. M. Suganth, editor-in-chief of The Times of India gave it 3 out of 5, stating that "The compilation of six films from six filmmakers in different genres makes it an entertaining experience." Baradwaj Rangan of The Hindu wrote "The key word is amateur, so it won’t help to go in expecting professional-grade acting or craft. What we can (must) do is see how these films fare in purely directorial terms." Behindwoods gave 2.5 out of 5 stars for the film stating "A little more concentration on the content would have justified the overall effort better." In contrast S. Saraswathi of Rediff gave 2 out of 5 stars stating "Bench Talkies is a very ordinary collection of short films. They fail to impress, leaving you with a sense of dissatisfaction."

References

External links
 

2015 films
Indian independent films
Indian anthology films
2010s Tamil-language films
Films directed by Karthik Subbaraj